Rowangchhari is an upazila (sub-district) of Bandarban District in southeastern Bangladesh, part of the Chittagong Division.

History

In the 16th century, the Marma people emigrated here from the Kingdom of Mrauk U in Arakan. Where the Rakhaing stream (known as a chhara in Bengali) meets the Tarachha canal, the Marmas established a settlement known as Rakhaing Wah, meaning the "Rakhaing river mouth". Bengalis from the nearby Chittagong District later arrived in the area for trade and commercial purposes. Over time, Rakhaing Wah grew into a haat bazaar and became known to Bengalis as Rowangchhari (Rowang is the Chittagonian word for Arakan and chhari refers to a small stream).

During the Bangladesh Liberation War of 1971, a brawl took place in Nowapatang Union leading to the death of T. N. Ali, a Bengali freedom fighter. Shamsul Islam ibn Amir Hamzah of Main Road and Dr S. A. Mahiuddin ibn Muhammad Abdur Rashid of Rowangchhari Bazar also fought in the war. There are also seven other individuals from Rowangchhari not mentioned in the official gazette that are said to have taken part. These are: Tarachha's Muhammad Ibrahim ibn Jalal Ahmad, Foraq Ahmad ibn Kala Mia, Qazi Muhammad Thanaullah ibn Qazi Ahmad Safa, Liaqat Ali ibn Faiz Ahmad and Muhammad Abdul Wadud ibn Siraj Ahmad, Rowangchhari Bazar's Abul Hasan Mir ibn Habibullah Mir, Abdul Aziz Chowdhury ibn Ashab Mia Chowdhury and Ejahan Mia ibn Dudu Mia.

In 1976, Rowangchhari was established as a thana. Its status was upgraded to upazila (sub-district) in 1983 as part of the President of Bangladesh Hussain Muhammad Ershad's decentralisation programme.

A minority of Tripuris in Rowangchhari have adopted Islam as their religion and have been subject to violence by some Tripuri Christians. On 18 June 2021, a Tripuri imam and farmer called Omar Faruq Tripura (formerly known as Bennichand Tripura) of Tulajhiri Aga Tripurapara was shot whilst heading home from Isha prayers at a makeshift mosque. Five out of the 38 families in this Tripurapara are Muslims and the rest are Christians.

Geography

It has a total area of 442.89 km2.

Demographics

According to the 2011 Bangladesh census, Rowangchhari Upazila had 6,292 households and a population of 27,264, 18.5% of whom lived in urban areas. 11.3% of the population was under the age of 5. The literacy rate (age 7 and over) was 31.0%, compared to the national average of 51.8%.

Rowangchhari is an ethnically diverse sub-district of Bangladesh. It is home to the Marma people who speak Arakanese, the Bawm who speak Banjogi, the Tanchangya who speak Tanchangya, the Mru who speak Mrung, the Khumi who speak Khumi Chin, the Khyang who speak Shö and the Bengalis who speak the Chittagonian dialect of Bengali.

Administration
Rowangchhari Upazila is divided into four union parishads: Alikhong, Nowapatang, Rowangchhari, and Tarachha. The union parishads are subdivided into 13 mauzas and 178 villages.

Facilities
There are 43 churches, 41 Buddhist temples, 5 Hindu temples and 12 mosques in Rowangchhari. There are two madrasas in Rowangchhari; the North Chhaingya Nurani Madrasa and the West Chhaingya Nurani Madrasa. The mosques are:
Rowangchhari Jame Mosque, Rowangchhari Bazar
Rowangchhari Wagaipar Jame Mosque
North Chhaingya Jame Mosque
South Chhaingya Jame Mosque
Middle Chhaingya Jame Mosque
East Chhaingya Jame Mosque
Gherau Bazar Jame Mosque
Betchhara Bazar Jame Mosque
Tarachha Mukh Jame Mosque
Muramnango Police Camp Jame Mosque
Banchhaya Jame Mosque, Alekkhang Union
Kachhaptali Para Army Camp Jame Mosque, Alekkhang Union

See also
Upazilas of Bangladesh
Districts of Bangladesh
Divisions of Bangladesh

References

Upazilas of Bandarban District